"Long Live the Queen" was the third and final single from UK based songwriter Frank Turner's second album Love Ire & Song. It was released as a digital download and as a 7" split single along with Crazy Arm's "Still to Keep". The 7" split was released on 22 March 2010 to celebrate his huge tour in March 2010, and features a live recording of "Long Live the Queen" recorded live at London's Shepherd's Bush Empire and taken from Frank Turner's 2010 live DVD Take to the Road.

"Long Live the Queen" was released as a benefit single for the Breast Cancer Campaign, in honour of a close friend who succumbed to the disease. The song's lyrics are based on what his dying friend told him.

Digital track listing

7" track listing

Charts

References

2008 singles
2010 EPs
Split singles
Frank Turner songs
Songs written by Frank Turner
2008 songs
Xtra Mile Recordings singles